Garhwali (in native pronunciation) is an Indo-Aryan language of the Central Pahari subgroup. It is primarily spoken by over  million Garhwali people in the Garhwal region of the northern Indian state of Uttarakhand in the Indian Himalayas.

Garhwali has a number of regional dialects. It is not an endangered language (Ethnologue lists it as "vigorous"), it is nonetheless designated as "vulnerable" in UNESCO's Atlas of the World's Languages in Danger, which indicates that the language requires consistent conservation efforts.

Geographical distribution 
Garhwali is spoken primarily by people in Tehri Garhwal, Pauri Garhwal, Uttarkashi, Chamoli, Rudraprayag and Dehradun districts of Garhwal division in the state of Uttarakhand. Garhwali is also spoken by Garhwali migrants to other parts of India including Himachal Pradesh, Delhi, Haryana, Punjab, Uttar Pradesh. According to various estimates, there are at least 3.5 million Garhwali migrants living in Delhi and the National Capital Region.

It is difficult to estimate the exact number of Garhwali speakers, as different agencies give different accounts of this number. According to the 2001 Census of Languages in India, there were 22,67,314 Garhwali language speakers, while Ethnologue gave a much larger figure of 29,20,000 Garhwali language speakers in a 2005 report. As per the latest 2011 Census of Languages in India, there are an estimated 24,82,089 speakers, and as of 2022, Ethnologue uses the same estimate.

Names 
Ethnologue has catalogued alternate names by which Garhwali is known such as Gadhavali, Gadhawala, Gadwahi, Gashwali, Girwali, Godauli, Gorwali, Gurvali, and Pahari Garhwali. These alternate names of the language may have come from the speakers having more than one name for their language, or variant Romanisations of what is essentially the same name. Gadwallis  schollar Gadwall's Kukareithi use Gadwallis or Gaddish for all literary & legal purpose.

History 

Historically, in the Middle Indo-Aryan period there were a variety of languages called Prakrits. Of these, Khas Prakrit is believed to be the source of Garhwali.

The earliest form of Garhwali can be traced to the 10th century, found in numismatics, royal seals, inscriptional writings on copper plates and temple stones containing royal orders and grants. Most Garhwali literature is preserved in folk form, passed down orally. However, since the 18th century, Garhwali has developed a literary tradition. Until the 17th century, Garhwal was always a sovereign nation under the Garhwali Kings. Naturally, Garhwali was the official language of the Garhwal Kingdom.

Stage of development 
According to Hindi linguists and other international linguists Gadwallis is developed through the below cycle :-
Proto Indo-European => Proto-Indo-Iranian => Proto-Indic => Middle Indic => Gadwallis.

But a scholar from Ganga-Salan Gadwall named Gadwall's Kukareithi suggests a different cycle mentioned below :-
Proto Indo-European => Proto-Indo-Iranian => Proto-Caspian => Middle Caspian (Old Kashmiri & Old Gadwallis) => Middle Gadwallis => Modern Gadwallis.

Audio recordings 
The earliest known audio recordings of Garhwali language were done in the monumental Linguistic Survey of India (LSI) led by George Abraham Grierson, a member of the Indian Civil Service and a linguist. LSI documented more than 300 spoken Indian languages and recorded voices and written forms between 1894 and 1928. Garhwali language was featured in Part IV - 'Pahari Languages & Gujuri' of Volume IX - 'Indo-Aryan Languages, Central Group' published in 1916 by Grierson. Recordings include the Parable of the Prodigal Son and of a well-known folk-tale: the fable of the Bundle of Sticks in Garhwali.

Sub-languages and dialects

Morphology

Pronouns

Cases

Numerals

Verb conjugation 
Conjugation of the verb दॆख्ण (deykhna) "to look", in all three tenses in Garhwali.

Present tense

Past tense

Future tense

Phonology 
There are many differences from Hindi and other Indic languages, for example in the palatal approximant , or the presence of a retroflex lateral .  Garhwali also has different allophones.

Vowels

Monophthongs
There are many theories used to explain how many monophthongs are used in the Garhwali language. The Non-Garhwali Indian scholars with some Garhwali scholars (who believe Garhwali is a dialect of Hindi) who follow Common Hindustani phonology argue that there are eight vowels found within the language: ə, ɪ, ʊ, ɑ, i, u, e, o. A Garhwali language scholar Mr. Bhishma Kukreti argues that /ɑ/ is not present in the language instead of it long schwa i.e. /ə:/ is used. Although it can be accepted that southern Garhwali dialects have uses of /ɑ/ instead /ə:/. If we follow his rule of vowel length we found that there are five vowels found in Garhwali. Three are ə, ɪ, ʊ with long forms /ə:/, /ɪ:/, /ʊ:/. The other two are /o/ & /e/ with no vowel length. But there are 13 vowels founded by Mr. Anoop Chandra Chandola as follows /ə/, /ɪ/, /ʊ/, /ɑ/, /i/, /y/, /u/, /e/, /o/, /æ/, /ɨ/, /ɔ/, /ɯ//. His arguments can be accepted as universal (also /ɑ/ which is used only in Southern dialects but borrowed to Standard dialect for distinction purposes) . But Bhishma Kukreti's argument about vowel length is also accepted. Hence we concluded that Garhwali (Standard Garhwali in this mean) has thirteen vowels (/ə/, /ɪ/, /ʊ/, /ɑ/, /i/, /y/, /u/, /e/, /o/, /æ/, /ɨ/, /ɔ/, /ɯ/) where three has vowel length (/ə:/, /ɪ:/, /ʊ:/).

The newer studies (by Gadwall's Kukareithi) reveals a slightly different but easier classification of Gaddish vowels. He writes, "There is no doubt that Gaddish is developed in a very complex and crucial way. It (Gaddish) has taken a lot of elements of all the Indo-European languages. [...] As it comes to vowels, Gaddish has variety of vowels & allo-vowels as well. But my classification of Gaddish vowels is need of time for making Gaddish a standard one."

Gaddish is only language having voiceless vowels. Kukareithi orders Gaddish vowelic alphabets as :- a, i, e, u, o.

 Most of the times all vowels when come at the beginning of the word pronounced voiceless. This is a characteristic of Vadic lects retained in Standard Gaddish and its western dialects. But developed into a:, i:, u: (voiced) in Standard Sanskrit. In Gaddish, y is voiceless counterpart of "i & e" & w is counterpart of "u & o". ** Although few dialects has no such behaviour regarding gone voiceless when the vowel comes at the beginning. It can happen at any position of vowel.
 When it comes to long pronunciation of vowels they again behave like Vadic vowels did. Vowel 'a' pronounced "a:", vowel 'i' as "i:", vowel 'u' as "u:", vowel 'e' as "ay" & vowel 'o' as "aw".
 When the vowels used at any point except beginging or end, pronounced as usual i.e. short sounded. It means 'a' as अ , 'i' as, 'u' as, 'e' as, 'o' as.

Diphthongs
There are diphthongs in the language which makes the words distinctive than other. However diphthongs vary dialect by dialect. 

Triphthongs are less commonly found in the language. The most common word where a triphthong may occur is ह्वाउन [English: may be] /hɯɔʊn/ (in standard Garhwali) or /hɯaʊn/ (in some dialects). However many speakers can't realize the presence of triphthongs. Other triphthongs might be discovered if more academic research were done on the language.

Consonants

Tenuis consonants

Aspirated consonants
य्, र्, ल्, ळ्, व्, स् and the nasal consonants (म्, न्, ञ्, ङ्, ण्) have no aspirated consonantal sound.

Allophony
The Garhwali speakers are most familiar with allophones in the Garhwali language. For example, फ (IPA /pʰ/) is used as फ in the word फूळ (IPA /pʰu:ɭ/ English: flower) but pronounced as प (IPA /p/) in the word सफेद (IPA /səpet/, English: "white").

Allophones of aspirated consonants

Conversion to tenuis consonant or loss of aspiration
Almost every aspirated consonant exhibits allophonic variation. Each aspirated consonant can be converted into the corresponding tenuis consonant. This can be called loss of aspiration.

Allophone of छ

Allophones of tenuis consonants

Conversion from voiced to voiceless consonant
A few of the tenuis consonants have allophonic variation. In some cases, a voiced consonant can be converted into the corresponding voiceless consonant.

Other allophones

Assimilation 
Garhwali exhibits deep Assimilation (phonology) features. Garhwali has schwa deletion, as in Hindi, but in other assimilation features it differs from Hindi. An example is the phrase राधेस्याम. When we write this separately, राधे & स्याम (IPA:- /rəːdʰe/ & /syəːm/) it retains its original phonetic feature, but when assimilated it sounds like रास्स्याम /rəːssyəːm/ or राद्स़्याम /rəːdçyəːm/.

Samples

Problems and issues 
According to the UNESCO Atlas of World's Languages in Danger, Garhwali is in the category of "vulnerable language".

The reasons for this are manifold. Key amongst them is the lack of patronization at the State and Central government levels. Garhwali is regarded as a 'dialect' or 'mother tongue' as per the Census of Languages and is counted as a dialect of Hindi. It has not received patronage at the State level. History has a role to play as well. Historically, Sanskrit was the language of the Garhwal Kingdom court and Garhwali was the language of the people. During the British Raj and in the period after Independence of India, the Garhwal region was included in the Hindi-speaking state of Uttar Pradesh for decades. Further, Uttar Pradesh government's policy of affirmative action through the law of reservation of jobs for the SCST population in Uttar Pradesh is said to have led to increased migration of Hindi speakers from the plains of Uttar Pradesh to the cities of Garhwal to make up for the low percentage of SCST population in Garhwal. These factors are also said to contribute to increased importance of Hindi and reduced prestige for Garhwali language in the minds of the local population.

Today, Garhwali is not used in the official domain. It is not taught at school or college level. Its usage remains limited to home and local use. Further, migration to other parts of India and the ever-increasing pressure of globalization has led to diminishing importance of Garhwali for the local population. Knowledge of Garhwali is not regarded as a special skill and gathering Hindi and English skills for economic and social progress are viewed as critical.

Out-migration for economic reasons has further relegated the language to 'low prestige' status amongst its speakers. Since the creation of Garhwal army regiments during the British rule, temporary out-migration had been the trend. Over the last century, as most of the economic opportunities tended to concentrate in plain areas, temporary out-migration followed by eventual return-migration was witnessed. Since 2000, the situation has changed substantially with many out-migrating permanently along with families from Garhwal mainly to eke out their livelihoods and better future of their children.

Successive state governments have not done much to stem the tide. The state does not accord Garhwali the status of state language. Hindi and Sanskrit are the official languages of Uttarakhand. State universities did not have Garhwali language departments until as recently as 2014. Garhwali has not received much attention from the academia, and much of the research on the language has been driven by local linguists. In 2017, the state government announced a proposal to adopt English as the medium of instruction for early-age learners (from Class 1) in 18000 government schools, thus ignoring the key role played by the mother tongue or home language in early learning and subject-based learning.

The economic development experience of Uttarakhand continues to mainly centred in three plain districts of the State, and ten hill districts remain far behind in this increasing prosperity of the State. Due to this lopsided development, the pace of out-migration could not slow down from the hill districts of the Uttarakhand after its formation. The pace of out-migration is so huge that many of the villages in Garhwal are left with a population in single digit.

These are some of the factors contributing to the deteriorating health of Garhwali and the declining number of its speakers. While the UNESCO "vulnerable language" category is by far the healthiest category amongst the categories of endangered languages, it does not take long for a language to gradually head towards the category of 'critically endangered'.

Struggle for official recognition
Since the formation of Uttarakhand in 2000, successive state governments have been slow-footed in promoting and developing the regional languages of Uttarakhand. Like other languages of Uttarakhand, Garhwali, the most spoken language does not have official recognition. In 2010, Hindi was made the official language and Sanskrit the second official language of the Uttarakhand.

Ceding to long-standing demands to make Garhwali the official language of Uttarakhand and to be taught at schools and universities, in 2014 the Uttarakhand state government issued orders to set up departments of Kumaoni and Garhwali languages at Kumaon University and Garhwal University respectively and to introduce Kumaoni and Garhwali language courses at the undergraduate level. In 2016, State Council of Educational Research and Training (SCERT) announced that Garhwali, Kumaoni, Jaunsari and Rang languages would be introduced on pilot basis for students in standard one to 10th in government schools Under the 'Know Your Uttarakhand' project. In July 2019, the Uttarakhand government announced that Garhwali language school books would be introduced in primary schools from classes 1 to 5 in a pilot project in 79 schools in Pauri Garhwal district.

At the national level, there have been constant demands to include Garhwali in the 8th schedule of the Constitution of India so that it could be made one of the Scheduled Language of India. In July 2010, a Member of Parliament from Pauri Garhwal, Satpal Maharaj brought a private member's bill in the Lok Sabha to include Garhwali and Kumaoni languages in the Eighth Schedule of the Constitution. As is the case with most private member's bills, this bill was not discussed in parliament and has since lapsed.

Organisations 
There have been small movements to preserve and develop Garhwali language and culture but primarily, these have been restricted to individuals and communities.

The Akhil Garhwal Sabha, a citizen's group in Dehradun aims to raise awareness amongst young Garhwalis about Garhwali language and culture. From 2012 onwards, it has been organising an annual 2-week Garhwali language workshop in which it provides training in the language and presents the interesting specificities of the language to the learners in Dehradun. It has also been the organiser of a series of 7 days cultural programmes called Kautig Uttarakhand Mahotsava from 1998 onwards to promote traditional folk dances and traditions of Uttarakhand. It publishes a monthly Garhwali newspaper called Rant Raibar. On the initiative of the Akhil Garhwal Sabha, the Uttarakhand state department of culture published a comprehensive dictionary of the Garhwali language which has Hindi and English meanings of the Garhwali words. A team of authors led by eminent Garhwali scholars Achalanand Jakhmola and BP Nautiyal sourced Garhwali words spoken in all areas of Garhwal and compiled them in a most comprehensive lexicon of the language.

Winsar Publishing Company is an organisation that has dedicated a large part of its publications to Garhwali language and literature.

The first Garhwali language app called 'Chakhul Garhwali Dictionary' that lists Garhwali words as well as information on Garhwali culture, traditions and heritage was launched in 2015.

In 2017, the Delhi state government announced its intention to create 12 regional language academies under the government's Art, Culture and Languages Department including an academy for Garhwali language. In 2018, the Uttarakhand state government announced plans to launch a State Cultural Centre as a hub of all cultural activities in Dehradun which would have an auditorium, six art galleries, a library, a museum, an amphitheatre and a place for symposiums and seminars to promote Uttarakhand's traditional 'Pahari' language and culture.

Literature
Modern day Garhwali has rich literature in all genres including poetry, novels, short stories and plays. Earlier, Garhwali language was present only as folklore. It had practically no literature. Though according to Saklani, a regular literary activity throughout the known history of Garhwal has been reported with most of such efforts related to the orthodox themes of religious matters, poetics, astronomy, astrology, and ayurveda, etc. Most of these works were the copies of the ancient texts, however, few original works related to history, poetry, religion, and architecture are also said to exist. It was only in the 20th century, due to the influence of English language, modern literary forms and themes were adopted. This literature was written both in Hindi and Garhwali.

The oldest manuscript in Garhwali that has been found is a poem named "Ranch Judya Judige Ghimsaan Ji" written by Pt. Jayadev Bahuguna (16th century). In 1828 AD, Maharaja Sudarshan Shah wrote "Sabhaasaar". In 1830 AD, American missionaries published the New Testament in Garhwali. The Gospel of St. Matthew in Garhwali was printed at Lucknow in the year 1876. Pandit Gobind Prasad Ghildyal, B.A. translated the first part of the Hindi Rajniti into Garhwali, and this was printed at Almora in 1901. Several specimens of Garhwali were also found in Pandit Ganga Datt Upreti's 'Hill Dialects of the Kumaon Division'. Pandit Ganga Datt Upreti also collected and published 'Proverbs & folklore of Kumaun and Garhwal' in 1894. The principal forms of Garhiwali Grammar were first published in Dr. Kellogg's Hindi Grammar (2nd edition, London, 1893). The first and comprehensive research work about the Garhwali language, its various dialects, where is it spoken, number of speakers, grammar, vocabulary, phrases and specimens was done in Part IV - Volume IX of the Linguistics Survey of India.

The five local Hindi newspapers of Garhwal of the early 20th century helped to bring about cultural and political awakening in Garhwal. The early writers keen to project and nurture the cultural heritage of Garhwal. These papers were conscious of the cultural-exclusiveness of the region and nurtured the feeling for 'Garhwal nationalism'. Atma Ram Gairola wrote in a poem that Garhwalis of both the parts (State and British) are extremely proud of the fact that 'we are Garhwalis'. Writers like Chandra Mohan Raturi and Tara Dutt Gairola asked the young writers to write only in the 'Garhwali' language, because one could write more sweetly, poignantly and judiciously in one's own mother tongue. These poets and writers brought renaissance in the Garhwali literature. Collections of various oral-folk-literary traditions, like ancient folk songs, Mangal, Bhadiyali, Panwara etc. were also made available during this period.

Some of the famous writers of Garhwal of that era were Sudarsan Shah, Kumudanand Bahuguna, Hari Dutt Sharma (Nautiyal), Hari Krishna Daurgadutti Rudola, Urvi Dutt Shastri, Bal Krishna Bhatt, Mahidhar Dangwal, etc. Few writers writing in Garhwali were Chandra Mohan Raturi, Satyasaran Raturi, Atma Ram Gairola, Sanatananand Saklani, Devendra Dutt Raturi, Suradutt Saklani, etc. Some of the historians were Mola Ram, Miya Prem Singh, Hari Dutt Shastri, Hari Krishna Raturi, Vijaya Ram Raturi.

Contemporary literature 
Garhwali literature has been flourishing despite government negligence. Today, newspapers like "Uttarakhand Khabarsar" and "Rant Raibaar" are published entirely in Garhwali. Magazines like "Baduli", "Hilaans", "Chitthi-patri" and "Dhaad" contribute to the development of the Garhwali language.

In 2010, the Sahitya Akademi conferred Bhasha Samman on two Garhwali writers: Sudama Prasad 'Premi' and Premlal Bhatt. The Sahitya Akademi also organized "Garhwali Bhasha Sammelan"(Garhwali Language Convention) at Pauri Garhwal in June 2010. Many Garhwali Kavi Sammelan (poetry readings) are organized in different parts of Uttarakhand and, in Delhi and Mumbai.

Notable writers 

Abodh Bandhu Bahuguna – (1927–2004) Known for his contribution to modern Garhwali writing including plays, poems, and essays. Some writings include Gaad, Myateki Ganga, and Bhumyal.
 Atmaram Gairola
 Ravindra Dutt Chamoli
 Bachan Singh Negi – "Garhwali translation of Mahabharata and Ramayana"
 Baldev Prasad Din (Shukla) "Bata Godai kya tyru nau cha" (Garhwali Nirtya-natika)
 Beena Benjwal – "Kamedaa Aakhar"
 Bhagbati Prasad Panthri – "Adah Patan" and "Paanch Phool"
 Bhajan Singh 'Singh' – "Singnaad"
 Bhawanidutt Thapliyal – "Pralhad"
 Bholadutt Devrani – "Malethaki Kool"
 Bijendra Prasad Naithani "Bala Sundari Darshan", "Kot Gaon Naithani Vanshawali", "Ristaun ki Ahmiyat", "Chithi-Patri-Collection"
 Chakradhar Bahuguna – "Mochhang"
 Chandramohan Raturi – "Phyunli"
 Chinmay Sayar – "Aunar"
 Dr. Narendra Gauniyal – "Dheet"
 Dr. Shivanand Nautiyal
 Durga Prasad Ghildiyal – "Bwari", "Mwari" and "Gaari"
 Harish Juyal 'Kutaj' – "Khigtaat"
 Govind Chatak – "Kya Gori Kya Saunli"
 Harsh Parvatiya – "Gainika nau par"
 Jayakrishna Daurgadati – "Vedant Sandesh"
 Jayanand Khugsaal – "Jhalmatu dada"
 Kanhaiyyalal Dandriyal (Kavi/Poet) – "Anjwaal", "Mangtu", "Nagraja" (in 2 parts)
 Keshavanand Kainthola – "Chaunphal Ramayan"
 Lalit Keshwan – "Khilda Phool Hainsda Paat", "Hari Hindwaan"
 Lalit Mohan Thapalyal – "Achhryun ku taal"
Leeladhar Jagudi – (1944) Writer and novelist. PadmaShri
 Lokesh Nawani – "Phanchi"
 Madan Mohan Duklaan – "Aandi-jaandi saans"
 Mahaveer Prasad Gairola – "Parbati"
 Pratap Shikhar – "Kuredi phategi"
 Premlal Bhatt – "Umaal"
 Purushottam Dobhal
 Sadanand Kukreti
 Satyasharan Raturi – "Utha Garhwalyun!"
 Shreedhar Jamloki – "Garh-durdasa"
 Sudaama Prasad Premi – "Agyaal"
 Sulochana Parmar
Taradutt Gairola –  (1875– 1940) Known for his contribution to the folk-lore of Garhwal and for writing modern Garhwali poetry including 'Sadei' (सदेई).
 Virendra Panwar – "Inma kankwei aan basant"(Poetry)"Been(critic)Chween-Bath(interviews)Geet Gaun Ka(Geet)kathga khauri haur(Translation of Hindi story Dr Ramesh Pokhriyal Nishank to Garhwali)
 Vishalmani Naithani "Chakrachal", "Kauthik", "Beti Buwari", "Pyunli Jwan Hwegi", "Matho Singh Bhandari Nirtya Natika", "Meri ganga holi ta mai ma bauri aali", "Jeetu Bagdwal", etc. scripts writer.
Narendra Kathait  has also enriched Garhwali language by writing world class literature in Garhwali language. The literature written by him is as follows. 
Poetry Collection – "Tabari Ar Abari", "Tup-Tap", "Pani"
Satire Collection – "Kulla Pichkari", "Lagyan Chhaan", "Ados-Pados", "Hari Singho  Baggi Fast", "Aar-Parai Ladai",  "Samsya Khadi Cha", "Naaraz Ni Huyaan", "Bakki Tumari Marji",
Drama Dr. Asaram", "Panch Parani Pachis Chhawin",

सन्दर्भ

Usage

In media
Garhwali folk singers like Narendra Singh Negi, Preetam Bhartwan, Chander Singh Rahi , Anil Bisht, Kishan Mahipal, Manglesh Dangwal, Santosh Khetwal, Gajendra Rana, Kalpana Chauhan, Anuradha Nirala, Pritam Bhartwan,  Rohit Chauhan, Meena Rana, Jeet Singh Negi, Jagdesh Bakrola and many more have renewed interest in the Garhwali language by their popular songs and videos.

Anuj Joshi is one of the prominent Garhwali film directors.

The very first Internet radio of Kumaon/Garhwal/Jaunsar was launched in 2008 by a group of non-resident Uttarakhandi from New York. It was launched to give exposure to Uttarakhand folk music and to bring the melody from the heart of Himalaya to the global screen. Gaining significant popularity among inhabitants and migrants since its beta version was launched in 2010. This was named after a very famous melody of the hills of Himalaya, Bedupako Baramasa O Narain Kafal Pako Chaita Bedupako

See also
 Garhwal Division
 Kumaoni language
 Garhwal Kingdom
 SIL

Further reading

Anoop Chandra Chandola. "A syntactic sketch of Garhwali" [unpublished Ph.D. dissertation], University of Chicago, 1973.
Govind Chatak-"Garhwali bhasha", Lokbharti Prakashan, Dehradun, 1959.
Govind Chatak- "Madhya Pahari ki Bhashik Parampara aur Hindi", Takshila Prakashan, Delhi, 2000.
Gunanand Juyal-"Madhya Pahari bhasha (Garhwali Kumaoni) ka anushilan aur uska Hindi se sambandh", Navyug Granthagar, Lucknow, 1976.
Haridutt Bhatt 'Shailesh'- "Garhwali bhasha aur uska sahitya", Hindi Samiti, UP, 1976.
Abodhbandhu Bahuguna- "Garhwali bhasha ka vyakaran", Garhwali Prakashan, New Delhi.
Rajni Kukreti- "Garhwali bhasha ka Vyakaran", Winsar Pub., Dehradun,2010.
Govind Chatak- "Garhwali Lokgeet", Sahitya Akademi, New Delhi, 2000.
Saket Bahuguna- "A sketch of Garhwali grammar with a focus on grammatical gender" [Unpublished M.Phil. dissertation], Department of Linguistics, University of Delhi, 2015. 
Yashwant Singh Kathoch- "Uttarakhand ka Naveen Itihaas", Winsar Pub, Dehradun, 2006.
Pati Ram Bahadur- "Garhwal:Ancient and Modern", Pahar Publications, 2010.
Bachan Singh Negi – "Ramcharitmanas, Sreemad Bhagwat Geeta" – Garhwali translations, Himwal Publications, Dehradun, 2007.
Part IV - Volume IX of The Linguistics Survey of India  -  'Pahari Languages & Gujuri'

Notes

References

External links

Northern Indo-Aryan languages
Languages of Uttarakhand
Garhwal division
Endangered languages of India
Languages of Sudurpashchim Province